Palata may refer to:
 Paratha, the Burmese name for the Indian flatbread
 Palata, Italy, Commune in Italy.
 Palata, Nepal, Rural municipality in Nepal.
Palata (river) in Belarus and Russia
Palata Sakan, a village in western Burma
Astride Palata (born 1982), a Congolese handball player
Barbodes palata, a genus of cyprinid fish endemic to the Philippines

See also
Palatas